An IT specialist, computer professional, or an IT professional may be:
 a person working in the field of information technology;
 a person who has undergone training in a computer-field-related colleges, universities and computer institutes; or
 a person who has proven extensive knowledge in the area of computing.

Technology specialist
Job titles for a computer professional include:

 computer incident responder
 computer repair technician
 computer scientist
 database administrator
 digital forensics analyst
 firewall administrator
 information technology consultant
 intrusion detection system analyst
 network administrator
 programmer (also known as a software engineer)
 system administrator
 systems analyst
 web developer

See also
 List of computer occupations

References

How to become it specialist